Adet Lin (May 6, 1923 – 1971) was a Chinese-American novelist and translator. She also published under the name Tan Yun. She was also known as Lin Rusi.

Biography
The oldest daughter of Lin Yutang, she was born in Amoy and came to the United States at the age of thirteen. With her sisters Tai-yi and Mei Mei, she published Our Family, an autobiographical work, in 1939. In 1940, with Tai-yi, she published Girl Rebel, a translation of the autobiography of Xie Bingying. The sisters published a second book, Dawn over Chungking, in 1941. After studying at Columbia University, she went on to work for the American Bureau for Medical Aid to China from 1943 to 1946. Afterwards, she returned to the United States and worked for the United States Information Agency and the Voice of America.

She published her first novel Flame from the Rock in 1943; the book is set in China during the Second Sino-Japanese War.

On May 1, 1946, she married Richard Biow, son of advertising executive Milton H. Biow. Lin killed herself in Taipei in 1971.

Selected works 
 Our Family (1939), with Lin Tai-yi (Anor Lin)
 Dawn over Chungking (1941), with Lin Tai-yi (Anor Lin) and Lin Mei Mei
 Flame from the Rock (1943), under pseudonym Tan Yun
 The Milky Way and Other Chinese Folk Tales (1961)
 Flower Shadows, translation of Tang dynasty poetry (1970)

References 

1923 births
1971 suicides
20th-century American novelists
20th-century American translators
20th-century American women writers
Chinese women novelists
Columbia University alumni
People from Xiamen
Republic of China novelists
Republic of China translators
Writers from Fujian
Biow family
Chinese emigrants to the United States
Suicides by hanging in Taiwan